Bus Queensland was formed in April 2009 when the Pulitano Group purchased both the Garden City Sunbus and Kynoch Coaches operations.

Kynoch Coaches was a family-owned business, previously owned by Jason Ward, operated urban, school and long-distance services from its base, in Stephen Street, Toowoomba.

Garden City Sunbus was a division of Sunbus and formed in September 2003 after Hagan's City Bus handed back its licence due to Queensland Transport rejecting requests for higher subsidies.

Bus Queensland operated a network of long-distance coach services from Toowoomba to Cunnamulla, Lightning Ridge and Rockhampton. In January 2015, further contracts commenced for services from Brisbane to Charleville and Mount Isa and from Townsville to Mount Isa.

On 10 December 2021, Bus Queensland's contracts passed to the operators listed below:

Fleet
As at October 2021, the fleet consisted of 80 buses and coaches.

References

Bus companies of Queensland
Toowoomba
Transport companies established in 2009
2009 establishments in Australia